The Second Hughes ministry (National Labor) was the 12th ministry of the Government of Australia. It was led by the country's 7th Prime Minister, Billy Hughes. The Second Hughes ministry succeeded the First Hughes ministry, which dissolved on 14 November 1916 following the split that took place within the governing Labor Party over the issue of conscription. This led to Hughes and his supporters leaving the party to form the National Labor Party, which swiftly received parliamentary support from Joseph Cook and the Liberal Party. The ministry was replaced by the Third Hughes ministry on 17 February 1917 after National Labor and Commonwealth Liberal merged into the Nationalist Party.

Billy Hughes, who died in 1952, was the last surviving member of the Second Hughes ministry; Hughes was also the last surviving member of the Watson ministry, First Fisher ministry, Third Fisher ministry and Third Hughes ministry.

Ministry

References

Ministries of George V
Hughes, 2
1916 establishments in Australia
1917 disestablishments in Australia
Cabinets established in 1916
Cabinets disestablished in 1917